Sævar Atli Magnússon (born 16 June 2000) is an Icelandic footballer who plays as a forward for Danish club Lyngby.

Club career
He made his debut for Leiknir Reykjavík on 3 October 2015, aged 15, in the last round of the season, coming on as a substitute in a match against Keflavík. He signed for Danish club Lyngby on 5 August 2021 and was promoted with them to the Danish Superliga at the end of the 2021–22 season.

International career
He has featured for the Icelandic U16, U17, U18, U19 and U21 youth sides.

References

External links
 
 

2000 births
Living people
Saevar Atli Magnusson
Saevar Atli Magnusson
Saevar Atli Magnusson
Saevar Atli Magnusson
Saevar Atli Magnusson
Danish 1st Division players
Danish Superliga players
Saevar Atli Magnusson
Lyngby Boldklub players
Saevar Atli Magnusson
Expatriate men's footballers in Denmark
Saevar Atli Magnusson